Pahal may refer to:

 Pahal (magazine), a Hindi literary magazine
 Pahal, Iran
 PAHAL, a direct benefit transfer scheme in India; see Aadhaar